Song Sun-ho (born 24 January 1966) is a South Korean former footballer and current manager of Bucheon FC. He played as defender.

Career
He was appointed as an interim manager of Bucheon FC on 29 May 2015. He was promoted to full-time manager on 3 October 2015.

References

1966 births
Living people
Association football defenders
South Korean footballers
South Korean football managers
Jeju United FC players
K League 1 players
Bucheon FC 1995 managers
Asan Mugunghwa FC managers